The Musée Ingres (In English: Ingres Museum) is located in Montauban, France. It houses a collection of artworks and artifacts related to Jean Auguste Dominique Ingres, and works by another famous native of Montauban, Antoine Bourdelle.

History 
In 1851, Ingres, at 71 years of age, gave part of his collection, including copies, work of pupils, and Greek vases, as a gift to the city of his birth. The Ingres room was inaugurated in 1854. The death of Ingres in January 1867 led to a considerable enrichment of the collection with additional works, in particular several thousands of drawings. The episcopal palace is the subject of a classification as monument historique by decree of March 11, 1910.

Collection 
The museum is located in a building that once served as the residence of the bishops of Montauban. The structure belongs chiefly to the 17th century, but some portions are much older, notably an underground chamber known as the Hall of the Black Prince (Salle du Prince Noir). During World War II, the Musée Ingres served as one of the temporary places of storage for the Mona Lisa, evacuated from the Louvre at the beginning of the war. A renovation carried out between 1951 and 1958 made Musée Ingres a modern institution according to the designs of the time, equipped with additional inventories. Expanded, modernized and digitized, the museum now covers 2,700 m2 with new spaces, improved accessibility, a new museography, a conservation cabinet housing Ingres's drawings, an entire floor devoted to the work of Antoine Bourdelle, rooms for temporary exhibitions. The Ingres Museum took advantage of its transformation to change its name and become the Ingres-Bourdelle Museum, thus paying homage to the two artists that the city saw born. There are other places that also pay homage to Antoine Bourdelle, such as the Musée Bourdelle in Paris or the Bourdelle Garden Museum in Égreville.

Among the paintings by Ingres in the collection are:

Joseph Ingres (1804)
Jean-François Gilibert (1804)
Lorenzo Bartolini (1805)
The Dream of Ossian (1813)
Christ Giving the Keys to St. Peter (1820)
Roger Freeing Angelica (1841 version)
Madame Henri Gonse (1845–1852)
Jesus among the Doctors (1862)

See also
 List of single-artist museums

References

External links

1854 establishments in France
Art museums established in 1854
Ingres
Ingres
Museums in Tarn-et-Garonne
Ingres